Verkhny Uslon (Yuğarı Oslan) is a rural locality (a selo) and the administrative center of Verkhneuslonsky District of the Republic of Tatarstan, Russia. Population:

References

Notes

Sources

Rural localities in Verkhneuslonsky District
Sviyazhsky Uyezd